Collie Power Station is a power station in Collie, Western Australia. It is coal powered with one steam turbine that generates a total capacity of 300 megawatts of electricity. The coal is mined locally from the Collie Sub-basin and is transported to the power plant by overland conveyor. On 14 June 2022 the state government announced that Synergy would close Collie Power Station by 2027.

The station was commissioned in 1999 with a single 300 megawatts steam turbine. Power generated by the station supplies the south-west of Australia through the South West Interconnected System (SWIS) operated by Western Power.

References

External links 
Verve Energy page on Collie Power Station

Coal-fired power stations in Western Australia